Marie Dupouy (born 2 November 2001) is a French rugby union player.

Dupouy was called into France's squad as a replacement for their star scrum-half, Laure Sansus, who sustained a knee injury in their pool game against England at the delayed 2021 Rugby World Cup. However, after arriving in New Zealand she was placed in solitary confinement due to a positive COVID test.

References 

Living people
2001 births
Female rugby union players
French female rugby union players